Alioune Gueye (born February 25, 1987) is a Senegalese footballer.

Career

Africa
Gueye began his professional career in his native Senegal, playing for his hometown team Casa Sport in the Senegal Premier League, before moving to Nigeria in 2006 to playing with Dolphins in the Nigerian Premier League. He helped Dolphins win the Nigerian FA Cup in 2006 and 2007, and played in the CAF Confederation Cup in 2007 and 2008.

North America
Gueye joined the Cleveland City Stars of the USL First Division in May 2009, and made his debut for the team on May 16, 2009, against the Minnesota Thunder. Gueye appeared in 21 matches and scored one during the 2009 season. When the season came to a conclusion the Cleveland franchise folded after one season in the USL First Division, thereby resulting in the club releasing all its players from their contracts.

On March 3, 2010, Charleston announced the signing of Gueye to a contract for the 2010 season.

Gueye was not listed on the 2011 Charleston roster released April 7, 2011.

Angola
On 9 March 2011 signed with Clube Recreativo da Caála in Angola.

Honors

Charleston Battery
USL Second Division Champions (1): 2010
USL Second Division Regular Season Champions (1): 2011.   1/8 caf cup with recreativo da caala scors 2 goals in 2013. 27 games 2014 plus 1cup game

References

External links
 Charleston Battery bio
 Cleveland City Stars bio
 Kafute Player Agency

1987 births
Living people
Cleveland City Stars players
Senegalese footballers
Expatriate footballers in Nigeria
Senegalese expatriate footballers
USL First Division players
USL Second Division players
Dolphin F.C. (Nigeria) players
Charleston Battery players
Casa Sports players
Association football midfielders